David Spenser (né De Saram; 12 March 1934 – 20 July 2013) was a British actor, director, producer and writer. Spenser played the title role in a 1948 radio production of Richmal Crompton's Just William, and also appeared in popular films and TV series including Doctor Who. His documentary about Gwen Ffrangcon-Davies won an International Emmy Award. He was the elder brother of actor Jeremy Spenser.

Aged 11 he appeared in plays on BBC radio's Children's Hour. He was cast in Just William by the author of the books, Richmal Crompton.

He played Harry in the first production of Benjamin Britten's opera Albert Herring.

Spenser was a regular on television, with appearances in episodes of Z-Cars, Dixon of Dock Green, and The Saint. In 1967 Spenser appeared as Thonmi in the Doctor Who serial The Abominable Snowmen alongside Patrick Troughton. Spenser later worked as a radio producer for the BBC. He produced several radio plays including Anthony Trollope's The Way We Live Now in 1988, and Christopher Isherwood's Mr Norris Changes Trains in 1984.

Spenser wrote a historical drama about the Egyptian pharaoh Akhnaton, The City of the Horizon. It was broadcast in 1972 and 1976. Spenser subsequently produced documentaries about figures such as Benny Hill, Angus Wilson, Dodie Smith and Gwen Ffrangcon-Davies.

He was survived by his brother, and by his partner Victor Pemberton.

Filmography

References

External links
 
 Radio Memories David Spenser's radio work

1934 births
2013 deaths
20th-century English male actors
British expatriates in Spain
British male child actors
British male film actors
British male television actors
English radio producers
English television producers
English television writers
English gay actors
British gay writers
British LGBT screenwriters
English LGBT writers
People from Colombo
British male television writers
21st-century British screenwriters
20th-century British businesspeople
21st-century LGBT people